Rooiels (Afrikaans equivalent of red alder) is a settlement in Overberg District Municipality in the Western Cape province of South Africa. The name is often written as Rooi-Els, but the name of the township was registered as Rooiels (one word). It was declared a township in June 1948, and is situated 5 km north of Pringle Bay, on the eastern shore of False Bay. It was named after the farm and river by this name. 

It is situated beside the Kogelberg Biosphere Reserve and is itself a registered conservancy. The town roads are narrow, un-tarred and without street lights. Klein-Hangklip mountain dominates the village, and is home to a pair of Verreaux's eagles. Other  animals that may be noted are chacma baboons, rock hyrax, small antelope, African clawless otters and occasionally caracal and leopard.

References

 Note: Another river by this name is situated near Knysna in the southern Cape. The red alder tree does not currently occur near Rooi-Els.

External links

Populated places in the Overstrand Local Municipality